Barry Paul Maguire (born 27 April 1998) is a Scottish professional footballer who plays as a midfielder for Dundee, on loan from Motherwell. Maguire is a product of the Motherwell Academy and spent the second half of the 2018–19 season on loan at Queen of the South.

Club career

Motherwell
On 7 April 2018, Maguire debuted for Motherwell, playing 73 minutes in a 0–0 draw away to St Johnstone.

On 26 June 2018, Maguire signed a new one-year contract with the Steelmen until the end of the 2018–19 season.

On 5 January 2022, Maguire signed a new contract with Motherwell, keeping him at the club until the summer of 2024.

Queen of the South (loan) 
On 1 January 2019, Maguire signed a loan deal with Dumfries club Queen of the South until 31 May 2019. On 16 February 2019, Maguire was sent-off after conceding a penalty in the 40th minute of a league match versus Dundee United at Palmerston. The Doonhamers lost the match 1–0 as Nicky Clark subsequently converted the spot-kick.

Dundee (loan) 
On 26 January 2023, Maguire joined Scottish Championship club Dundee on loan until the end of the season. He would make his debut and first start twp days later in a 3–0 victory over league leaders Queen's Park.

International career
In March 2019, Maguire debuted for the Scotland under-21 team against Mexico under-22s. He scored his first goal at under-21 level on 25 March 2019, against Sweden.

Career statistics

References

External links
 
 

1998 births
Living people
Scottish footballers
Association football defenders
Motherwell F.C. players
Scottish Professional Football League players
Footballers from Bellshill
Queen of the South F.C. players
Dundee F.C. players
Scotland under-21 international footballers